Sadik Kadir (born 27 July 1981) is a former professional tennis player from Australia.

Biography
Originally from the Indonesian city of Surabaya, Kadir later grew up in Sydney.

Kadir made two main draw appearances at the Australian Open. At the 2005 Australian Open he and Shannon Nettle received a wild card for the men's doubles event. They were beaten in the first round by ninth seeds Cyril Suk and Pavel Vízner. He also featured in the main draw of the 2006 Australian Open, in the men's doubles with Todd Reid. Again facing an all Czech pairing in the opening round, Kadir and his partner narrowly lost to Ivo Minář and Jiří Vaněk.

In 2009 he won two ATP Challenger titles, the Burnie International in Tasmania and Karshi in Uzbekistan.

Challenger titles

Doubles: (2)

References

External links
 
 
 

1981 births
Living people
Australian male tennis players
Tennis players from Sydney
Sportspeople from Surabaya
Indonesian emigrants to Australia